Lake Linkmenas is a lake in Aukštaitija National Park, Ignalina District, Lithuania. It is 2,300 metres long and 600 metres wide. Linkmenas is part of a chain of seven interconnected lakes. The only major settlement on the shore is Ginučiai, which has an old watermill.

External links

Linkmenas